Ballads is a jazz album by David Murray released on the Japanese DIW label in 1988. It features six quartet performances by Murray with Fred Hopkins, Dave Burrell and Ralph Peterson Jr.

Reception
The Allmusic review by Stephen Cook awarded the album 3 stars stating "Ballads is an excellent set on all levels and even the sound is superb. One of the best albums of the '80s. ".

Track listing
 "Valley Talk" (Burrell) – 7:14
 "Love in Resort" – 4:44
 "Ballad for the Black Man" – 11:02
 "Paradise Five" – 8:19
 "Lady in Black" (Peterson) – 8:00
 "Sarah's Lament" (Burrell) – 7:12
All compositions by David Murray except as indicated

Personnel
David Murray – tenor saxophone
Dave Burrell – piano
Fred Hopkins – bass
Ralph Peterson, Jr. – drums

References 

1988 albums
David Murray (saxophonist) albums
DIW Records albums